Kassim Bizimana (born 29 December 1985) is a Burundian former footballer who played as a  striker.

Career
Bizimana played for the youth teams of SC Heerenveen and Achilles 1894. He began his professional career in 2004 with FC Groningen. His first professional game was on 22 October 2004 against Willem II Tilburg, when he replaced Jack Tuyp in the 74th minute. Groningen lost 4-2.

In July 2005, he was transferred to BV Veendam.

His spell at Veendam would prove to be his last in professional football, as he moved to the Hoofdklasse club Sneek Wit Zwart in 2009. After this, he played in the Hoofdklasse side Velocitas 1897 (2010–12), Berkum (2012), Flevo Boys (2012–13) and PKC '83 (2013–16). In 2017, he started playing for Pelikaan-S. After a year he left for VV Gieten, where he left halfway through the season. Despite this, he became the club's top scorer with 15 goals.

International career
He has represented his homeland, Burundi, at international level, and in 2007 was a candidate for the Rwanda national football team.

Statistics

Personal
He holds a Dutch passport.

References

External links
 Player in his Club VVS Neekwitzwart
 www.bvveendam.nl Player Profile in his club
 
 Statistics

1985 births
Living people
Sportspeople from Bujumbura
Burundian footballers
Burundi international footballers
SC Veendam players
Association football forwards
FC Groningen players
Eredivisie players
Eerste Divisie players
Burundian expatriate footballers
Expatriate footballers in the Netherlands
Burundian expatriate sportspeople in the Netherlands
Achilles 1894 players
VV Sneek Wit Zwart players
Flevo Boys players